The 2014 Alcorn State Braves football team represented Alcorn State University in the 2014 NCAA Division I FCS football season. The Braves were led by third year head coach Jay Hopson and played their home games at Casem-Spinks Stadium. They were a member of the East Division of the Southwestern Athletic Conference (SWAC) and finished with a record of 10–3 and as SWAC champions after they defeated Southern in the SWAC Championship Game.

After the season, Alcorn State was named the 2014 black college football national champions.

Schedule

References

Alcorn State
Alcorn State Braves football seasons
Black college football national champions
Southwestern Athletic Conference football champion seasons
Alcorn State Braves football